The 1919–20 Challenge Cup was the 20th staging of rugby league's oldest knockout competition, the Challenge Cup.

First round

Second round

Quarterfinals

Semifinals

Final
Huddersfield defeated Wigan 21-10 in the Challenge Cup Final played at Headingley, Leeds in front of a crowd of 14,000.

This was Huddersfield’s third Challenge Cup final win in their third final appearance. They retained the trophy, having won the Cup in the last season before the suspension due to the First World War.

References

Challenge Cup
Challenge Cup